Paul F. Barry (August 7, 1926  – December 28, 2014) was an American football running back in the National Football League for the Los Angeles Rams, Washington Redskins, and Chicago Cardinals.  He played college football at the University of Tulsa and was drafted in the thirteenth round of the 1949 NFL Draft.

References

External links
NFL.com player page
 Pro-football-reference.com

1926 births
2014 deaths
Players of American football from El Paso, Texas
American football running backs
Tulsa Golden Hurricane football players
Los Angeles Rams players
Washington Redskins players
Chicago Cardinals players